Protonyctia is a monotypic moth genus in the family Douglasiidae. Its only species, Protonyctia originalis, is found in Ecuador. Both the genus and species were first described by Edward Meyrick in 1932.

References

Moths described in 1932
Douglasiidae
Gracillarioidea genera